Edward Jones (born 30 January 1960) is an Australian rugby union coach and former player. He currently coaches the Australia national rugby union team after returning to replace Dave Rennie in January 2023 following his sacking from England. He was the head coach of the England national team from 2015 to 2022.

He previously coached Australia between 2001 and 2005, taking the team to the 2003 Rugby World Cup final. He was an advisor with South Africa when the Springboks won the 2007 Rugby World Cup, and from 2012 to 2015 he coached Japan, leading them in the 2015 Rugby World Cup and an upset win over South Africa. In November 2015, Jones was appointed head coach of England and led them to win the 2016 and 2017 Six Nations Championships, becoming only the second national team to be unbeaten in a calendar year. He led England to the 2019 Rugby World Cup final where they were beaten by South Africa.

Jones played as a hooker for Sydney club Randwick and New South Wales and began coaching Randwick in 1994. He continued his career in Japan between 1995 and 1997 for Tokai University, as an assistant to the Japan national team and for Suntory Sungoliath. In 1998 he returned to Australia, taking charge of ACT Brumbies in Super Rugby and also coached the Queensland Reds in the 2007 Super Rugby season. In 2008, he had a brief spell at Saracens in England's Premiership, before returning to Japan and Suntory Sungoliath for a second spell which culminated in winning the 2011–12 Top League championship.

Personal life 
Jones was born in Burnie, Tasmania, to a Japanese mother and an Australian father. He is married to Hiroko Jones, a Japanese woman whom he met while teaching at the International Grammar School in Sydney. They have a daughter, Chelsea Jones. Jones is a supporter of West Ham United F.C. and the South Sydney Rabbitohs NRL team.

Playing career
Born in Tasmania, Jones started his playing career at Matraville Sports High School. He played as a hooker for Randwick between 1981 and 1991 and New South Wales. Jones played against the British and Irish Lions for New South Wales B in 1989. He also made three appearances for Leicester during the 1991/92 season in England. He retired to concentrate on a career as a teacher and school principal.

He is described in the Randwick Hall of Fame as follows: "A light-weight and mobile hooker who played 210 club games from 1981 to 1991, scoring 14 tries [56pts]. His first grade games numbered 147 and in them he scored 10 tries [40pts]. A tigerish forward, who played well above his weight, he supplemented good tight forward play by operating as a third flanker. He played in six first grade grand finals [1984 to 1989] of which Randwick lost only two [1985 and 1986]. He also played in two reserve grade finals [1983 and 1991]. captaining the side which won in 1991, which was his last game for Randwick. He was the club's best and fairest player in 1982, was awarded the Ron Don trophy for the most improved club player in 1982 and 1985 and the Wally Meagher trophy for the best clubman in 1990."

Coaching career

Early coaching career
In 1994 Jones gave up his career as a teacher and school principal to coach his former club Randwick. He then went to Japan, where he had brief stints coaching Tokai University, Japan (as assistant coach) and Suntory Sungoliath.

ACT Brumbies
Jones returned to Australia in 1998 to coach the ACT Brumbies. However, he had a disappointing first season in charge, with the club finishing only 10th in the Super 12; he has since said he was "way out of his depth".

Jones went on to lead the Brumbies into the best period of their history. In 2000 they were runners-up, losing the final to the Crusaders, but in 2001 he coached them to their first title, the first team from outside New Zealand to win the tournament. Notably, while with the Brumbies, it was Jones who was credited with discovering George Smith while at a trial for a Rugby league team, the Manly Warringah Sea Eagles.

Australia
In 2001 Jones coached Australia A during the British & Irish Lions tour of Australia, the fourth scheduled fixture of the tour and predicted to be the toughest up to that point of the tour. The match was tight early-on, however Australia A were dominating from the restarts and kicked numerous penalty goals to lead the Lions at half-time, 15–6. Australia A maintained their steady lead via the boot of Manny Edmonds, putting them into a fifteen-point lead. Although the Lions fought back toward the end of the match, the Australia A team remained ahead, winning 28–25. Aside from the national team, Australia A was the only side to win against the touring Lions side. 

This success led to his appointment as head coach of Australia before their Tri Nations Series  later, following Rod Macqueen's retirement. Under Jones, Australia won the 2001 Tri Nations, and then entered their home World Cup in 2003 as third favourites behind New Zealand and England. They managed to upset the All Blacks in the semi-final before losing to England in the final in extra time through a last-minute drop goal.

After the World Cup, Jones was awarded a contract to lead Australia through to the 2007 Rugby World Cup. He also had an offer to coach Japan which he turned down.

In 2005, the Wallabies suffered a spate of injuries, losing seven games straight. At the end of their European tour they lost eight of the last nine matches, with the scrum in particular struggling. After a 22–24 loss to Wales at the Millennium Stadium on 2 December 2005, Jones' contract was terminated as the Wallabies head coach. While the Australian Rugby Union had ordered a report into the Wallabies after the season, including a review of Jones' position as head coach, it has been speculated that the Wallabies' loss to Wales prompted his dismissal before the investigation had even begun.

Post Wallabies
Just over a month after Jones was relieved of his position as Wallabies head coach, he signed a three-year deal with the Queensland Reds to take over as head coach after the 2006 Super 14 season. In February 2006 he joined Saracens in a consultancy role until the end of the season to help them after they were struggling near the bottom of the league.

Jones endured a torrid season with the Reds in 2007, who finished bottom of the Super 14 table, only managing two wins the entire season. Injury spells meant Jones at times had to do without up to eight regulars in his starting team, including the loss of influential Wallabies fullback Chris Latham even before the season started. His last match was an away defeat to the Bulls by a Super Rugby record margin of 89 points, which led to mounting calls in the media for him to be sacked. His stint at the Reds is by far the least successful of his coaching career and he resigned after just one season in charge. During his time at the Reds he was also fined $10,000 dollars for calling the performance of referee Matt Goddard "disgraceful" and "lacking common sense" after a close 6–3 loss to his former side the Brumbies.

South Africa
Later in 2007, Jones turned down an approach from Fiji to be a technical advisor to the 2007 Rugby World Cup in France, and instead was appointed by Springbok coach Jake White to be the technical advisor for the South African team at the tournament. He was criticised by the ARU Chief Executive John O'Neill for taking up a job to try to help Australia's rivals.

South Africa went on to win the World Cup and Jones was praised for his role in the success, with former coach Nick Mallett calling the move from White to appoint him a "masterstroke" and crediting Jones with improved backline play by South Africa at the tournament. Despite being an official part of the Springbok coaching team, Jones was not given a Springbok blazer because he is not South African. He wore his tracksuit instead, a condition in his contract with SA Rugby prior to being appointed.

After the World Cup, Jones rejoined Saracens, initially in an advisory role, before taking over the director of rugby role for the 2008/09 season. However, he announced in February that he would be stepping down at the end of the season due to personal reasons, but he then quit early in March 2009 after disagreements with the board. He described this period as the worst he has had in rugby.

Return to Japan
After leaving Saracens, Jones rejoined Suntory Sungoliath in Japan. He brought together a strong team, including George Smith, Fourie du Preez and Danie Rossouw, whom he had coached previously, and led them to victory in the Top League title in 2012, winning the final 47–28 against the Panasonic Wild Knights, as well as two consecutive All Japan Championship wins.

Following the resignation of Sir John Kirwan, Jones was appointed in 2012 as head coach of the Japan national team, to lead them to the 2015 Rugby World Cup. He quickly took the team in a different direction from Kirwan. His first move as the Japan coach was to reduce the number of foreign players, who had been a prominent part of the Japan team under Kirwan, and to encourage the Japanese to play their own style. He also said his goal was to bring Japan up a level, to be among the top 10.

Despite losing all three of his first Pacific Nations Cup matches by narrow margins, in November 2012 Jones coached the side to their first ever wins in Europe, beating Romania and Georgia.

In 2013, Jones led Japan to their sixth consecutive championship win in the Asian Five Nations, where they achieved a tournament record score of 121–0 against the Philippines. Japan lost to Tonga in the opening round of the 2013 IRB Pacific Nations Cup, and were later defeated by Fiji in round 2. Following these matches, Jones coached the Brave Blossoms to a series draw against Wales after narrowly losing the first test 18–22 and winning the second test 23–8. This was the first time Japan had recorded a victory over the Welsh.

On 16 October, Jones was hospitalised for two days after a suspected stroke. With his release from hospital, it was announced that he would miss Japan's 2013 end-of-year rugby union tests against New Zealand, Scotland, Gloucester, Russia and Spain, and that former Australia skills coach and current technical adviser for Japan, Scott Wisemantel, would coach Japan in the interim for the end-of-year tests.

In 2014, Jones secured Japan's seventh consecutive Asian Five Nations title, before jointly winning the 2014 IRB Pacific Nations Cup with Fiji. Japan won the Asia/Pacific conference with victories over Canada 34–25 and the United States 37–29. In June of that year, Japan claimed a 26–23 victory over Italy, which was Japan's tenth consecutive win, a record for a Tier 2 team. During the 2014 end-of-year rugby union internationals, Japan lost their series with the Māori All Blacks 2–0, but went on to secure an 18–13 win over Romania. Following this victory, Japan rose to ninth in the World Rankings, their highest-ever position, and achieved Jones' aim of reaching the top 10 in the world.

In 2015, after securing the 2015 Asian Rugby Championship, Japan suffered three consecutive losses in the 2015 World Rugby Pacific Nations Cup. After beating Canada 20–6, they lost to the United States, Fiji and Tonga to finish fourth with just one win. Japan later went on to beat Uruguay twice and Georgia in World Cup Warm-up matches. At the 2015 Rugby World Cup, Japan managed an upset win over South Africa with a spectacular last-minute try in their first pool match, finishing the match 34–32, an incredible victory with bold determination. However, Japan lost four days later to Scotland 45–10, despite still being in contention at half time. A week later, Japan secured a record victory over Samoa, winning 26–5, which guaranteed a top three finish for Japan in the pool. In the final match of the pool stage, Japan beat the United States 28–18, meaning that Japan became the first ever nation to record three victories in the pool stage while failing to advance to the knock out stage. That victory was Jones' last in charge of Japan.

Stormers
After completing his duties at the helm of Japan's national team at the 2015 Rugby World Cup, Jones joined Super Rugby franchise the Stormers in Cape Town on 12 November 2015. Just eight days after joining the Stormers, he was signed by England Rugby as Stuart Lancaster's replacement, to become England's first foreign head coach. The RFU paid a compensation figure of £100,000 to release him from his contract with the Stormers due to a break clause in the agreement. In November 2015, Jones became one of the highest-paid head coaches in world rugby.

England
Jones was named as the new England head coach on 20 November 2015. He agreed a four-year deal to become England's first foreign head coach, that would see him lead the team through the 2019 Rugby World Cup. The deal was extended twice and was scheduled to last until the end of 2023 World Cup. Jones brought in as his assistant coaches Steve Borthwick from Bristol, with whom he had also coached Japan, and Paul Gustard from Saracens.

In 2016, the coaching team led England to their first Grand Slam in 13 years, when they defeated all their opponents at the Six Nations Championship. They opened with a 15–9 win over Scotland before seeing out Italy 40–9. In Jones' first home game on 27 February 2016, he led England to a 21–10 victory over Ireland, before they went on to beat Wales 25–21 two weeks later; at one point in the match they were leading the Welsh team 19–0, but then conceded three tries in the second half. England secured the Championship on 13 March with one game in hand when Scotland beat France, meaning that England went into the final round having already secured the title. A 31–21 victory over France in the final game of the Championship on 19 March saw England win their first Grand Slam since 2003.

Three months later, Jones took his English side on a tour of Australia for a three-test series against the Wallabies; England won the series 3–0 in their first-ever three-test series victory. They scored their most points against Australia in the first test, winning 39–28, and claimed their third consecutive victory over the Wallabies on Australian soil when they won the second test 23–7, a record-winning streak for the game played in Australia's home territory. The final test confirmed the series whitewash, England winning the match 44–40. During the series, Jones had led England from fourth in the world to second. In the 2016 Autumn Internationals, he guided England through to their 14th consecutive win, 13 of these under his leadership, and they became just the second team after New Zealand to win every one of their games in a calendar year. Jones then led England to a 37–21 win against South Africa, their first victory over the Springboks since 2006. England later saw off Fiji 58–15, before beating Argentina 27–14 a week later, this despite an England player being sent off after five minutes. England finished the autumn tests with a 37–21 win over Australia.

During the 2017 Six Nations Championship, Jones experienced his first defeat as England head coach when the team travelled to Dublin for their final game of the Championship, which they lost 9–13. Not only would a win have secured England's second consecutive Grand Slam but it would also have been a record 19th consecutive victory. Despite this disappointment, England were the overall winners of the Championship with wins over France (19–16), Wales (21–16), Italy (36–15), and Scotland (61–21). In June 2017, Jones took an inexperienced side for a two-test series in Argentina; the team included 18 uncapped players, eight of whom were less than 21 years old. Nevertheless, England won the series 2–0 with a 38–34 victory in the first test and a 35–25 victory in the second. England continued their form during the 2017 Autumn Internationals, winning all three of their tests: 21–8 against Argentina, 30–6 against Australia, and 48–14 against Samoa.

England finished the 2018 Six Nations Championship in their lowest-ever position in the league table, and their worst since the 1983 Five Nations Championship, finishing in fifth place having only beaten Italy (46–15) and Wales (12–6). England's consecutive losses to Scotland, France and Ireland were their first triple defeat since 2014. Their loss to Scotland was the first since 2010, and their loss to Ireland was the first at home since 2010. A 45–63 loss against the Barbarians followed in May of the same year, with former England international Chris Ashton scoring a hat-trick of tries against his ex-teammates. England's run of defeats continued into the June test series, when they lost the first two matches of their three-test series against South Africa. However, they avoided a 3–0 series defeat by winning the third test 25–10 to claim their first win in South Africa since 2000. When former All Blacks and Eagles coach John Mitchell joined the coaching team as defence coach, England achieved a return win (12–11) against South Africa in a tightly contested match on 3 November in the 2018 Autumn Internationals. Another close-fought test against New Zealand a week later also finished with a single-point scoreline difference (15–16), but this time in favour of the opposition. England then won their remaining autumn tests against Japan (35–15) and Australia (37–18). The win against the Wallabies was England's sixth consecutive victory over the Australians, continuing their perfect record against Jones' former team during his tenure.

England drew 38–38 with Scotland in the 2019 Six Nations Championship, meaning that Scotland retained the Calcutta Cup. England had led 31–0 just half an hour into the match but Scotland scored six unanswered tries to go 38–31 ahead with five minutes remaining, only for England to tie the score with a converted try in the last play of the match. Jones claimed that his team had a recurring "mental block" that needed fixing after a similar incident three weeks previously against Wales. The 38–38 draw is currently the highest-scoring tied match in international rugby history.

Jones guided England to their first World Cup final since 2007 when they beat reigning world champions New Zealand 19–7 in the semi-finals of the 2019 Rugby World Cup. South Africa overpowered England in the final a week later to deliver a 32–12 defeat, ending Jones' ambition of leading his team to World Cup glory in Japan.

On 6 December 2022, Jones was sacked as England head coach by the RFU following a poor run of results in which England had won just 5 of 12 tests in 2022.

Return to Australia 
In January 2023 Jones was re-appointed as the head coach of Australia, replacing Dave Rennie, and returning to his former post after . The appointment is reported to be worth A$4.5 million over the tenure of the appointment, and will go through until the conclusion of Australia's campaign at the 2027 Rugby World Cup in which Australia will also host. Jones will simultaneously coach the women's team. Jones will formally take-on the role on 29 January 2023.

Before taking the job as Australia coach, Jones and Rugby Australia (RA) executives, Hamish McLennan and Andy Marinos, had held numerous talks dating back six months, reportedly only days after the 2022 England tour of Australia. Although they were initially reported as insignificant due to Jones' England duties and Dave Rennie's contract (which lasted until the end of the 2023 Rugby World Cup), speculation was significantly heightened when Jones was let go by the RFU in December 2022.

Statistics

International matches as head coach

Australia
Note: World Rankings Column shows the World Ranking on the following Monday after each match.

Record by country

Australia record

Honours

Australia

Rugby World Cup
Runners-up: 2003
Tri Nations Series
Winners: 2001
Runners-up: 2002, 2003, 2004
Bledisloe Cup
Winners: 2001, 2002
Puma Trophy
Winners: 2002

Cook Cup
Winners: Jun 2004 (Australia), Nov 2004 (Australia)
Trophée des Bicentenaires
Winners: 2002, Jul 2005
Hopetoun Cup
Winners: June 2004, Nov 2004
Lansdowne Cup
Winners: 2003, 2005

Japan

Asian Five Nations/Asian Rugby Championship
Winner: 2012, 2013, 2014, 2015
World Rugby Pacific Nations Cup
Winner: 2014

England

World Rugby Coach of the Year
Winner: 2017
Rugby World Cup
Runners-up: 2019
Six Nations Championship
Winners: 2016, 2017, 2020
Runners-up: 2019
Grand Slam
Winners: 2016
Triple Crown
Winners: 2016, 2020
Calcutta Cup
Winners: 2016, 2017, 2020
Millennium Trophy
Winners: 2016, 2019, 2020
Quilter Cup
Winners: 2016, 2017, 2019
Ella-Mobbs Trophy
Winners: 2016, 2017, 2018, 2021, 2022
Autumn Nations Cup
Winners: 2020

Goldman Sachs
In November 2015 Jones was appointed by Goldman Sachs Group Inc. to the bank's advisory board in Japan. The board comprises people from the public and private sector and was created in 2001 to advise Goldman Sachs on business, regulatory, and public policy issues in Japan. Masanori Mochida, president of Goldman Sachs Japan Co stated that "Goldman Sachs will benefit from his unrivaled leadership and his ability to bring together a multi-cultural team".

Other honours

Randwick
Shute Shield
Winner: 1994

Japan (as assistant coach)
Asian Rugby Championship
Winner: 1996

Brumbies
Super 12
Winner: 2001
Runner-up: 2000

South Africa (as assistant coach)
Rugby World Cup / Webb Ellis Cup
Winner: 2007

Suntory Sungoliath
All-Japan Rugby Football Championship
Winner: 2011
Runner-up: 2009
Top League
Winner: 2012
Runner-up: 2011

Popular culture
Jones is featured in the documentary Eddie Jones: Rugby, Japan and Me aired on Sky Sports, 31 October 2018.

Notes

References

External links

 Eddie Jones | Rugby Database Profile

1960 births
Living people
ACT Brumbies coaches
Australia national rugby union team coaches
Australian expatriate sportspeople in England
Australian expatriate sportspeople in Japan
Australian people of American descent
Australian people of Japanese descent
Australian rugby union coaches
Australian rugby union players
England national rugby union team coaches
Japanese rugby union coaches
Japan national rugby team coaches
Leicester Tigers players
People educated at Matraville Sports High School